James Bridle (born 1980) is an artist, writer and publisher based in London.  Bridle coined the New Aesthetic; their work "deals with the ways in which the digital, networked world reaches into the physical, offline one." Their work has explored aspects of the western security apparatus including drones and asylum seeker deportation. Bridle has written for WIRED, Icon, Domus, Cabinet Magazine, The Atlantic and many other publications, and writes a regular column for The Guardian on publishing and technology.

Career
Bridle studied computer science and cognitive science at University College London and holds a master's degree.

They have been Adjunct Professor on the Interactive Telecommunications Programme at New York University.

In 2018 Bridle curated the Berlin exposition Agency, a group show on works of the artists Morehshin Allahyari, Sophia Al Maria, Ingrid Burrington, Navine G. Khan-Dossos, Constant Dullaart, Anna Ridler and Suzanne Treister at Nome gallery. Topics were mass surveillance and transnational terrorism, climate change and conspiracy theories, anti-social media and rapacious capitalism.

In April 2019 BBC Radio 4 broadcast a four part series by Bridle called 'New Ways of Seeing' examining how technology influences culture and analogue to John Berger’s Ways of Seeing. In March 2020 Bridle presented a keynote address at the Spy on me 2 festival (held in Berlin and online). Their 2019 film Se ti sabir that has its starting point in the Mediterranean Lingua Franca, premiered on 19 March 2020 in Berlin. Because of the COVID-19 pandemic, it had to be streamed on the HAU-YouTube channel.

Bridle's artworks and installations have been exhibited in Europe, North and South America, Asia and Australia.

In popular culture

For their 2022 book on the nature of intelligence, Ways of Being, they were interviewed by Brian Eno at a 5x15 event.

Works
 The Iraq War: A Historiography of Wikipedia Changelogs, 2010
 New Dark Age: Technology and the End of the Future, Verso, 2018, 
 Ways of Being: Animals, Plants, Machines: The Search for a Planetary Intelligence, Farrar, Straus & Giroux, 2022,

References

External links 
 List of works by James Bridle
 The blog of James Bridle: art, literature, and the network, since 2006
 Children of the Drone, Vanity Fair on James Bridle's drone projects
 James Bridle: The Drone Shadow Catcher, The New Yorker on James Bridle's drone projects
 What is our relationship with alien consciousnesses?, Essay on Artificial Intelligence 2019

Living people
1980 births
Artists from London
British technology writers
The Observer people
21st-century English artists
British curators